Monmouthshire County Council (or simply Monmouthshire Council) is the governing body for the Monmouthshire principal area – one of the unitary authorities of Wales.

The current unitary authority was created in 1996 and covers the eastern three-fifths of the historic county of Monmouthshire. The county council is based at County Hall in the hamlet of The Rhadyr, near Usk.

Since the 2022 elections the council has been under no overall control, with Labour the largest party. The leader of the council since the 2022 elections has been Mary Ann Brocklesby of Labour.

History

The current Monmouthshire County Council is the second body of that name. The first Monmouthshire County Council was created in 1889 under the Local Government Act 1888, taking over the local government functions of the quarter sessions. That council was based in Newport, initially meeting at the town hall and later building itself headquarters at Shire Hall in 1902. From 1891 Newport was a county borough and therefore outside the dominion of the county council, although the council continued to be based there. The first Monmouthshire County Council was abolished in 1974 under the Local Government Act 1972, when the area was absorbed into the new county of Gwent. Gwent County Council moved its headquarters to a new County Hall at Croesyceiliog on the outskirts of Cwmbran, which was already under construction at the time of the 1974 reforms.

The current Monmouthshire County Council was created in 1996 under the Local Government (Wales) Act 1994, which abolished Gwent County Council and the area's five district councils, creating new unitary authorities. The new authorities in Gwent were based on the previous districts, with the new Monmouthshire authority covering the pre-1996 Monmouth Borough plus the community of Llanelly from Blaenau Gwent district.

Political control
The first election to the new council was held in 1995, initially operating as a shadow authority before coming into its powers on 1 April 1996. Political control of the council since 1996 has been held by the following parties:

Leadership
The leaders of the council since 2002 have been:

Current composition 
As of 5 May 2022. The next election is due in 2027.

Elections
Elections take place every five years.  In the 2022 elections, Welsh Labour became the largest party, with 22 seats, and the Conservatives lost their overall majority, winning 18 of the 46 seats. The final result was decided by the toss of a coin after a tie between Conservative and Labour candidates in the ward of Llanfoist Fawr and Govilon; the seat was taken by the Conservatives. After the election, Labour formed a minority administration, with Mary Ann Brocklesby appointed as the first female leader of the council.

Party with the most elected councillors in bold. Coalition agreements in notes column.

Premises
From 1996 until April 2012, the council's administrative headquarters were at the six-storey former Gwent County Hall at Croesyceiliog, Cwmbran – outside its own dominion in the neighbouring borough of Torfaen and shared with Torfaen County Borough Council. It was closed because of "concrete cancer" and later demolished. In 2010 the authority had decided to relocate its headquarters functions to new offices at The Rhadyr in the community of Llanbadoc, just outside the town of Usk. Planning permission for the new building was granted in September 2011. The council moved to temporary offices in Magor whilst the new building was under construction.

A BBC television documentary "Carrying On at the Council" was broadcast in February 2012, after being filmed with Monmouthshire County Council over a period of seven months, in the lead up to their office move. The new county hall cost £6 million and was opened in 2013.

Electoral districts, areas and communities

For the purposes of electing councillors, the principal area is divided into forty-two electoral divisions, each returning one councillor, except Llanelly, known as Llanelly Hill, which has two councillors. These divisions date from 2004.

The council operates a decentralised system of administration, with four area committees: 
Bryn y Cwm, covering the Abergavenny area
Central Monmouthshire, centred on Monmouth
Lower Wye, for the Chepstow area
Severnside, the area around Caldicot

Although the council is described as a "unitary authority", there is in fact a second tier of government, with the entire area being divided into communities, all of which has either a town or community council.

Bryn y Cwm area

Central Monmouthshire area

Lower Wye area

Severnside

References

County councils of Wales
History of Monmouthshire
Local government in Monmouthshire
1996 establishments in Wales